Ahmed Tatarkhanovich Malsagov (1912 – 14 January 1942) was a Russian pilot in 5th Short-range Bomber Aviation Regiment during the Second World War who was killed in action. In 1995 he was declared a Hero of the Russian Federation.

Prewar life 
Malsagov was born in 1912 in the village of Altievsky in the Russian Empire to an Ingush family. In 1935 he joined the Red Army and in 1937 he graduated from the Stalingrad Military Aviation School. He became a member of the Communist Party in 1939. Before the start of the war, he was part of a bomber aviation regiment in the Western part of the USSR.

World War II 
During the German invasion of the Soviet Union Malsagov served in the 5th Short-range Bomber Aviation Regiment in the Odessa Military District. The regiment, originally equipped with Tupolev SBs, was soon provided with modern Petlyakov Pe-2 dive bombers right after the invasion. As a lieutenant he quickly mastered piloting the new aircraft and began making sorties on the Southern Front in June 1941, bombing a Romanian naval base, enemy tanks, and advancing troops. By 20 September 1941 he had made 65 sorties, and in the following winter, he distinguished himself after making 20 bombing sorties in the span of several days, for which he was awarded the Order of the Red Banner on 7 January 1942. Due to the precision of his bombing attacks, he was able to destroy ten tanks, five anti-aircraft guns, twenty-seven cars, and kill over 100 enemy infantrymen. On 14 January 1942 he was killed in action during a bombing mission and his funeral was held on 24 January. After the collapse of the Soviet Union he was declared a Hero of the Russian Federation in 1995.

Footnotes

References

1912 births
1942 deaths
Heroes of the Russian Federation
Soviet World War II pilots
Soviet military personnel killed in World War II
Recipients of the Order of the Red Banner
Ingush people